The Antarctic Artists and Writers Program is a research program funded and managed by the National Science Foundation which assists artists and writers who wish to work in Antarctica.

Notable participants
A list of participants and works before 2007 can be found at nsf.gov.
Werner Herzog, filmmaker, Encounters at the End of the World
Kim Stanley Robinson, science fiction author, Antarctica
Richard Panek, popular science writer, The 4 Percent Universe

External links
Official site

Arts organizations based in the United States
National Science Foundation